Traves is a commune in the Haute-Saône department in the region of Bourgogne-Franche-Comté in eastern France.

Notable residents
Former SS Standartenfuhrer Jochen Peiper bought property and lived near the village from 27 April 1972 until his assassination on 14 July 1976. One or more arsonists set his home afire, he was asphyxiated and his body burnt.

See also
Communes of the Haute-Saône department

References

Communes of Haute-Saône